Crawley is a small village in Hampshire, England. It is a few miles from the county town (and former capital) of Winchester. It is a civil parish within the City of Winchester local government district. The village is the location of Crawley Court, currently the headquarters of broadcast infrastructure company Arqiva.

Geography

Four roads each generally wider than 4m converge upon Crawley village, all meeting at the junction adjacent to Crawley pond. From the Church the lane travels in an Easterly direction, forming the main street of the village, until finally it reaches the junction at the pond.

Governance 
As well as constituting the eponymous parish council, Crawley lies within the wider City of Winchester. The village is part of the Wonston and Micheldever ward of Winchester City Council, which elects three councillors, and part of the wider Winchester Downlands ward, which elects a councillor to Hampshire County Council.

References

Civil parishes in Winchester
Villages in Hampshire